Khondakar is a Bengali Muslim surname found in Bangladesh and neighbouring East Indian regions.

Etymology and history
The Bengali surname comes from the Old Persian Khandan and the suffix kar which joins the root of the verb to mean the one who reads. The Bengali definition of the word is an instructor or teacher. The usage of Persian as an official language in Bengal was common during the rule of the Bengal Sultanate and the Mughal Empire. The Persians as well as members of the Turco-Persian tradition were a large immigrant community during both periods in which they integrated with the local Bengali community. Many Persians in Bengal became teachers, lawyers, scholars and clerics. These Persians merged with Bengalis to become Bengali Muslims.

Variations
Variations of the surname Khondakar also remain very common. These include different English transliterations and regional pronunciations of the term. Different English spellings include: Khondker, Khandaker, Khondoker, Khondokar, Khondaker, Khondkar,  Khandakar..Khandker, and Khandoker.

The variant Khandekar (Devanagari: खांडेकर) is a surname typically found in Maharashtrian Brahmin families, where the "kar" suffix denotes the native place of their ancestors.

Notables with the surname

Khondakar
Khondakar Abdul Hamid, journalist
Khondakar Abu Taleb, chief reporter of The Daily Ittefaq
Khondakar Abul Kashem, lecturer of History at the Pabna Edward College
Khondakar Ashraf Hossain, writer

Khondaker
Khondaker Hasibul Kabir, Bangladeshi landscape architect and sustainability advocate
Khondaker Mostaq Ahmad, President of Bangladesh

Khandaker
Khandaker Abdul Baten, MP for Tangail-6
Khandaker Abdul Malik, MP for Sylhet-1
Khandaker Abdur Rashid, Bangladesh Army officer
Khandaker Anwarul Haque, MP for Tangail-1
Khandaker Asaduzzaman, MP for Tangail-2
Khandaker Delwar Hossain, MP for Manikganj-1
Khandaker Mosharraf Hossain, MP for Comilla-2
Khandaker Muhammad Asad, Bangladeshi documentary photographer and photojournalist
Khandaker Rashiduzzaman Dudu, MP for Kushtia-3
Fuad Khandaker, IT Professional in USA
M. H. Khandaker, first Attorney General of Bangladesh

Khandakar
Golam Faruk Khandakar Prince, MP for Pabna-5

Others
Abdul Karim Khandker, Deputy Chief of Staff of the Bangladesh Armed Forces
Akbar Ali Khondkar, Indian politician
Hassan Mahmood Khandker, longest serving Inspector General of Police (Bangladesh)
Khandkar Manwar Hossain, founder of the Department of Statistics in Rajshahi University
Khandker Anwarul Islam, Secretary of the Bridges Division under Ministry of Road Transport and Bridges
Khandokar Mahbub Uddin Ahmad, MP for Dhaka-9
Khondkar Siddique-e-Rabbani , biomedical physicist
Khondokar Mahmud Hasan, 13th Chief Justice of Bangladesh

See also
Khondoker Abdul Majid High School

References

Bangladeshi Muslim names
Bengali Muslim surnames